Gerrit Jan van Heuven Goedhart (19 March 1901 – 8 July 1956) was a Dutch politician, diplomat and journalist. A member of the Labour Party (PvdA), he was Minister of Justice from 1944 to 1945 under Prime Minister Pieter Sjoerds Gerbrandy. He later served as the first United Nations High Commissioner for Refugees from 1951 until 1956.

Biography

Early life
Van Heuven Goedhart was born on 19 March 1901 in Bussum, North Holland. His father, Gijsbert Willem Goedhart, was a Protestant vicar. His mother was Francina Dingena Helena van Heuven. Van Heuven Goedhart was initially called Goedhart, but in 1933 he received permission to add his mother's maiden name to his surname. Van Heuven Goedhart studied law at Leiden University and graduated in 1926. The year before, he had already become a reporter for newspaper De Telegraaf. On 1 January 1930, at the age of 28, he was promoted to editor in chief. He was fired on 1 June 1933 because he refused to publish an article that called the newly elected German leader Adolf Hitler "a great statesman". He became editor in chief of regional newspaper Utrechts Nieuwsblad, where he would stay in office until the German invasion of the Netherlands.

Politics
During World War II, Van Heuven Goedhart worked as a reporter and editor in chief for the illegal resistance newspaper Het Parool. In 1944 he fled to London, where he was appointed Minister of Justice in the government in exile.

After the World War II, Van Heuven Goedhart returned to Het Parool, where he once again become editor in chief. In 1947, he also became Senator for the Labour Party. In 1951, he gave up both occupations to become the first High Commissioner for Refugees of the United Nations. Under Van Heuven Goedhart, the UNHCR was awarded the 1954 Nobel Peace Prize.

Van Heuven Goedhart was also the first chairman of the "state committee for the coordination of government information", the predecessor of the Netherlands Government Information Service.

Personal
Van Heuven Goedhart married Francis Becht (1899–1987) in 1924. The marriage was dissolved in 1931. In 1932, Van Heuven Goedhart married Norwegian Erna Hauan (1899–1991). Van Heuven Goedhart had two children from his second marriage, Karin Sophie and Bergliot Halldis. Van Heuven Goedhart died in Geneva on 8 July 1956, while being United Nations High Commissioner for Refugees.

Decorations

References

External links

Official
  Mr.Dr. G.J. (Gerrit-Jan) van Heuven Goedhart Parlement & Politiek
  Mr.Dr. G.J. van Heuven Goedhart (PvdA) Eerste Kamer der Staten-Generaal

 

 

1901 births
1956 deaths
Dutch expatriates in England
Dutch expatriates in Switzerland
Dutch expatriates in the United States
Dutch jurists
Dutch magazine editors
Dutch members of the Dutch Reformed Church
Het Parool editors
Dutch officials of the United Nations
Dutch people of World War II
Dutch political writers
Dutch reporters and correspondents
Dutch resistance members
Dutch war correspondents
Engelandvaarders
Independent politicians in the Netherlands
Knights of the Order of the Netherlands Lion
Labour Party (Netherlands) politicians
Leiden University alumni
Members of the Senate (Netherlands)
Ministers of Justice of the Netherlands
People from Bussum
Politicians from Utrecht (city)
United Nations High Commissioners for Refugees
20th-century Dutch diplomats
20th-century Dutch male writers
20th-century Dutch politicians
20th-century Dutch journalists
Nansen Refugee Award laureates